Ronald D'Oyley Good (5 March 1896 – 11 December 1992) was a British botanist notable for his floristic regionalization.

Good was born in Dorchester. He studied botany at Downing College, Cambridge, where he obtained an MA and Sc.D. He worked at the Botany Department of the Natural history museum (1922-1928). He worked at the Botany Department at the University of Hull from 1928 until his retirement in 1959. He was the author of The Geography of the Flowering Plants (1947) a popular work in botany.

Publications

Plants and Human Economics (1933)
The Old Roads of Dorset (1940)
A Geographical Handbook of the Dorset Flora (1948)
The Geography of the Flowering Plants (1947; 2nd ed. 1953, 3rd ed. 1964, 4th ed. 1974)
Features of Evolution in Flowering Plants (1956)
The Last Villages of Dorset (1979)
The Philosophy of Evolution (1981)
Concise Flora of Dorset (1984)

References

Good, Ron
Good, Ron
Good, Ron
Good, Ron
Good, Ron